Soccer Shrines is a 13-part Canadian television (TV) documentary series about the most famous soccer stadiums in the world and their fans. Produced by Best Boy Entertainment, Soccer Shrines originally aired on GolTV (Canada) in Fall 2010. The series currently airs on GolTV, Sundays at 11:30 am EST, Mondays 6:00 pm & 11:00 pm EST, Tuesday at 1:00 pm EST and on The Cave (TV channel) Sundays at 2:00 am & 8:30 pm EST and Wednesdays at 9:30 pm EST.

Premise 
Soccer Shrines brings audiences to 13 destinations to explore the near religious devotion of soccer fans worldwide. The show focuses on a famous soccer stadium in each location and delves into its history through the eyes of loyal fans. Each episode follows 3-4 fans on their journey to a famed soccer stadium.

Places Visited 
 Manchester, England
 Munich, Germany
 Amsterdam, Netherlands
 Paris, France
 Barcelona, Spain
 Marseille, France
 Glasgow, Scotland
 Milan, Italy
 London, England
 Johannesburg, South Africa
 Rio de Janeiro, Brazil
 Buenos Aires, Argentina

Teams and Stadiums 
 Manchester United F.C., Old Trafford
 FC Bayern Munich, Allianz Arena 
 AFC Ajax, Amsterdam Arena
 Paris Saint-Germain F.C., Parc des Princes
 FC Barcelona, Camp Nou
 Olympique de Marseille, Stade Vélodrome
 Celtic F.C., Celtic Park
 Olympiacos F.C., Karaiskakis Stadium
 A.C. Milan, San Siro
 Arsenal F.C., Emirates Stadium
 Kaizer Chiefs F.C., Loftus Versfeld Stadium
 Flamengo, Estádio do Maracanã
 Boca Juniors, La Bombonera

References

External links 
 Soccer Shrines - Best Boy Entertainment
 Soccer Shrines - IMDb
 Soccer Shrines Distribution Information
 Best Boy Entertainment

2010s Canadian documentary television series
2010 Canadian television series debuts
2010s Canadian sports television series
Television shows filmed in Newfoundland and Labrador
Canadian travel television series